"Red Light" is a song by rock band Siouxsie and the Banshees. It is the ninth track from their 1980 album Kaleidoscope. It was co-produced with Nigel Gray.

Writing and recording
The song was demoed by Siouxsie Sioux and Steven Severin at Warner Chappell studios. It was then recorded as a trio, with Severin on synthesisers, Siouxsie on vocals and Budgie on drums. The song featured the beat of "the Roland compu rhythm and a camera shutter motor rewind".  Budgie related: "I wanted the drums to fade in over the electronica beat and evoke a smoky club atmosphere".

Although it was not released as the third single of Kaleidoscope, a promo video for the song was shot by Clive Richardson on the same day as the video for the single "Christine".

Legacy
Santigold recorded an interpolation of the song on her track "My Superman" on her debut album Santogold. She stated:  "I remember one of the first times I heard "Red Light" it was at a party, and I remember going up to the DJ and being like, "Who's this?". It was that good. I kind of stopped and was like ... wow".

References

1980 songs
Siouxsie and the Banshees songs
Songs written by Siouxsie Sioux
Songs written by Steven Severin
Song recordings produced by Nigel Gray